The Original Secession Church or United Original Secession Church was a Scottish Presbyterian denomination formed in 1827 by the union of (1) the Anti-Burgher Old Lights, led by Thomas M'Crie the Elder and known as "the Constitutional Associate Presbytery" and (2) the portion of the Anti-Burgher New Lights that refused to merge with the Burgher New Lights, led by George Paxton and known as "the Synod of Protesters". The title 'United Original Secession Church' was adopted in 1842, after the 'Original Secession Church', by then led by Thomas M'Crie the Younger, united with the portion of the Burgher Old Lights that refused to merge with the Church of Scotland. In 1852 some of its members, including Thomas M'Crie the Younger, merged with the Free Church of Scotland formed by the Disruption of 1843. In 1956 the remainder of the Original Secession Church merged with the Church of Scotland.

Notable Original Secession churchmen
Thomas M'Crie, the elder (died 1835)
Thomas M'Crie, the younger  (died 1875)
George Paxton (died 1837)

Sources

References

Presbyterian denominations in Scotland
Religious organizations established in 1822
1956 disestablishments in Scotland
1822 establishments in Scotland
Organizations disestablished in 1956